Robert Edward Parsons (19 December 1941 – 13 August 2015
) was an Australian rules footballer who played with Footscray in the Victorian Football League (VFL).

Notes

External links 
		

2015 deaths
1941 births
Australian rules footballers from Victoria (Australia)
Western Bulldogs players